Miguel Courtois (born 1960) is a French/Spanish film director and producer. He is known for directing the 2004 biographical film, The Wolf.

Filmography

References

External links 

1960 births
Living people
French film directors
Spanish film directors